Shemot, Shemoth, or Shemos (—Hebrew for 'names', the second word, and first distinctive word, of the parashah) is the thirteenth weekly Torah portion (parashah) in the annual Jewish cycle of Torah reading and the first in the Book of Exodus. It constitutes . The parashah tells of the Israelites' affliction in Egypt, the hiding and rescuing of the infant Moses, Moses in Midian, the calling of Moses, circumcision on the way, meeting the elders, and Moses before Pharaoh.

It is made up of 6,762 Hebrew letters, 1,763 Hebrew words, 124 verses, and 215 lines in a Torah Scroll. Jews read it the thirteenth Sabbath after Simchat Torah, generally in late December or January.

Readings
In the Masoretic Text of the Tanakh (Hebrew Bible), Parashat Shemot has six "open portion" (petuchah) divisions (roughly equivalent to paragraphs, often abbreviated with the Hebrew letter  (peh)). Parashat Shemot has two further subdivisions, called "closed portion" (setumah) divisions (abbreviated with the Hebrew letter  (samekh)) within the open portion divisions. The first open portion divides the first reading. The second open portion covers the balance of the first and part of the second readings. The third open portion covers the balance of the second and part of the third readings. The fourth open portion covers the balance of the third and all of the fourth and fifth readings. The fifth open portion divides the sixth reading. And the sixth open portion covers the balance of the sixth and all of the seventh readings. Closed portion divisions separate the third and fourth readings and conclude the seventh reading.

First reading—Exodus 1:1–17
In the first reading, 70 descendants of Jacob came down to Egypt, and the Israelites were fruitful and filled the land. The first open portion ends here.

Joseph and all of his generation died, and a new Pharaoh arose over Egypt who did not know Joseph. He told his people that the Israelites had become too numerous and required shrewd dealing, lest they multiply and in a war join Egypt's enemies. So the Egyptians set taskmasters over the Israelites to afflict them with burdens—and the Israelites built store-cities for Pharaoh, Pithom and Raamses—but the more that the Egyptians afflicted them, the more they multiplied. The Egyptians embittered the Israelites' lives with hard service in brick and mortar and in the field. Pharaoh told the Hebrew midwives Shiphrah and Puah that when they delivered Hebrew women, they were to kill the sons, but let the daughters live. But the midwives feared God, and disobeyed Pharaoh, saving the baby boys. The first reading ends here.

Second reading—Exodus 1:18–2:10
In the second reading, Pharaoh asked the midwives why they had saved the boys, and the midwives told Pharaoh that the Hebrew women were more vigorous than the Egyptian women and delivered before a midwife could get to them. God rewarded the midwives because they feared God, and God made them houses. The Israelites continued to multiply, and Pharaoh charged all his people to cast every newborn boy into the river, leaving the girls alive. The second open portion ends here with the end of chapter .

As the reading continues with chapter , a Levite couple had a baby boy, and the woman hid him three months. When she could not longer hide him, she made an ark of bulrushes, daubed it with slime and pitch, put the boy inside, and laid it in river. As his sister watched, Pharaoh's daughter came to bathe in the river, saw the ark, and sent her handmaid to fetch it. She opened it, saw the crying boy, and had compassion on him, recognizing that he was one of the Hebrew children. His sister asked Pharaoh's daughter whether she should call a nurse from the Hebrew women, and Pharaoh's daughter agreed. The girl called the child's mother, and Pharaoh's daughter hired her to nurse the child for her. When the child grew, his mother brought him to Pharaoh's daughter, who adopted him as her son, calling him Moses, because she drew him out of the water. The second reading ends here.

Third reading—Exodus 2:11–25
In the third reading, when Moses grew up, he went to his brethren and saw their burdens. He saw an Egyptian striking a Hebrew, he looked this way and that, and when he saw no one, he struck the Egyptian and hid him in the sand. When he went out the next day, he came upon two Hebrew men fighting, and he asked the wrongdoer why he struck his fellow. The man asked Moses who had made him king, asking him whether he intended to kill him as he did the Egyptian, so Moses realized that his deed was known. When Pharaoh heard, he sought to kill Moses, but Moses fled to Midian, where he sat down by a well. The priest of Midian's seven daughters had come to water their father's flock, but shepherds drove them away. Moses stood up and helped the daughters, and watered their flock. When they came home to their father Reuel, he asked how they were able to come home so early, and they explained how an Egyptian had delivered them from the shepherds, and had also drawn water for the flock. Reuel then asked his daughters why they had left the man there, and told them to call him back to join them for a meal. Moses was content to live with the man, and he gave Moses his daughter Zipporah to marry. Moses and Zipporah had a baby boy, whom Moses called Gershom, saying that he had been a stranger in a strange land. The third open portion ends here.

In the continuation of the reading, the Pharaoh died, and the Israelites groaned under their bondage and cried to God, and God heard them and remembered God's covenant with Abraham, Isaac, and Jacob. The third reading and a closed portion end here with the end of chapter .

Fourth reading—Exodus 3:1–15
In the fourth reading, in chapter , when Moses was keeping his father-in-law Jethro's flock at the mountain of God, Horeb (another name for the Biblical Mount Sinai), the angel of God appeared to him in a flame in the midst of a bush that burned but was not consumed. God called to Moses from the bush, and Moses answered: "Here I am." God told Moses not to draw near, and to take off his shoes, for the place on which he stood was holy ground. God identified as the God of Abraham, Isaac, and Jacob, reported having seen the Israelites' affliction and heard their cry, and promised to deliver them from Egypt to Canaan, a land flowing with milk and honey. God told Moses that God was sending Moses to Pharaoh to bring the Israelites out of Egypt, but Moses asked who he was that he should do so. God told Moses that God would be with him, and after he brought them out of Egypt, he would serve God on that mountain. Moses asked God whom he should say sent him to the Israelites, and God said "I Will Be What I Will Be" (Ehyeh-Asher-Ehyeh), and told Moses to tell the Israelites that "I Will Be" (Ehyeh) sent him. God told Moses to tell the Israelites that the Lord (YHVH), the God of their fathers, the God of Abraham, Isaac, and Jacob, had sent him, and this would be God's Name forever. The fourth reading ends here.

Fifth reading—Exodus 3:16–4:17
In the fifth reading, God directed Moses to tell Israel's elders what God had promised, and predicted that they would heed Moses and go with him to tell Pharaoh that God had met with them and request that Pharaoh allow them to go three days' journey into the wilderness to sacrifice to God. God knew that Pharaoh would not let them go unless forced by a mighty hand, so God would strike Egypt with wonders, and then Pharaoh would let them go. God would make the Egyptians view the Israelites favorably, so that the Israelites would not leave empty handed, but every woman would ask her neighbor for jewels and clothing and the Israelites would strip the Egyptians. Moses predicted that they would not believe him, so God told him to cast his rod on the ground, and it became a serpent, and Moses fled from it. God told Moses to take it by the tail, he did so, and it became a rod again. God explained that this was so that they might believe that God had appeared to Moses. Then God told Moses to put his hand into his bosom, he did, and when he took it out, his hand was leprous, as white as snow. God told him to put his hand back into his bosom, he did, and when he took it out, it had returned to normal. God predicted that if they would not heed the first sign, then they would believe the second sign, and if they would not believe those two signs, then Moses was to take water from the river and pour it on the land, and the water would become blood. Moses protested that he was not a man of words but was slow of speech, but God asked him who had made man's mouth, so Moses should go, and God would teach him what to say. Moses pleaded with God to send someone else, and God became angry with Moses. God said that Moses' well-spoken brother Aaron was coming to meet him, Moses would tell him the words that God would teach them, he would be Moses' spokesman, and Moses would be like God to him. And God told Moses to take his staff with him to perform signs. The fifth reading and the fourth open portion end here.

Sixth reading—Exodus 4:18–31
In the sixth reading, Moses returned to Jethro and asked him to let him return to Egypt, and Jethro bade him to go in peace. God told Moses that he could return, for all the men who sought to kill him were dead. Moses took his wife and sons and the rod of God and returned to Egypt. God told Moses to be sure to perform for Pharaoh all the wonders that God had put in his hand, but God would harden his heart, and he would not let the people go. And Moses was to tell Pharaoh that Israel was God's firstborn son, and Pharaoh was to let God's son go to serve God, and should he refuse, God would kill Pharaoh's firstborn son. At the lodging-place along the way, God sought to kill him. Then Zipporah took a flint and circumcised her son, and touched his legs with it, saying that he was a bridegroom of blood to her, so God let him alone. The fifth open portion ends here.

As the reading continues, God told Aaron to go to the wilderness to meet Moses, and he went, met him at the mountain of God, and kissed him. Moses told him all that God had said, and they gathered the Israelite elders and Aaron told them what God had said and performed the signs. The people believed, and when they heard that God had remembered them and seen their affliction, they bowed their heads and worshipped. The sixth reading ends here with the end of chapter .

Seventh reading—Exodus 5:1–6:1
In the seventh reading, in chapter , Moses and Aaron told Pharaoh that God said to let God's people go so that they might hold a feast to God in the wilderness, but Pharaoh asked who God was that he should let Israel go. They said that God had met with them, and asked Pharaoh to let them go three days into the wilderness and sacrifice to God, lest God fall upon them with pestilence or the sword. Pharaoh asked them why they caused the people to rest from their work, and commanded that the taskmasters lay heavier work on them and no longer give them straw to make brick but force them to go and gather straw for themselves to make the same quota of bricks.

The people scattered to gather straw, and the taskmasters beat the Israelite officers, asking why they had not fulfilled the quota of brick production as before. The Israelites cried to Pharaoh, asking why he dealt so harshly with his servants, but he said that they were idle if they had time to ask to go and sacrifice to God. So the officers met Moses and Aaron as they came from meeting Pharaoh and accused them of making the Israelites to be abhorrent to Pharaoh and his servants and to give them a weapon to kill the people.

In the maftir reading that concludes the parashah, Moses asked God why God had dealt so ill with the people and why God had sent him, for since he came to Pharaoh to speak in God's name, he had dealt ill with the people, and God had not delivered the people. And God told Moses that now he would see what God would do to Pharaoh, for by a strong hand would he let the people go, and by a strong hand would he drive them out of his land. The seventh reading, a closed portion, and the parashah end here.

Readings according to the triennial cycle
Jews who read the Torah according to the triennial cycle of Torah reading read the parashah according to the following schedule:

In ancient parallels
The parashah has parallels in these ancient sources:

Exodus chapter 3
Figs were in it and grapes. It had more wine than water. Abundant was its honey, plentiful its oil. All kind of fruit were on its trees. Barley was there and emmer, and no end of cattle of all kinds."

In inner-Biblical interpretation
The parashah has parallels or is discussed in these Biblical sources:

Exodus chapter 1
The report of  that the Israelites were fruitful and multiplied echoes .

Exodus chapter 2
Each involves (1) a trip to a distant land, (2) a stop at a well, (3) a young woman coming to the well to draw water, (4) a heroic drawing of water, (5) the young woman going home to report to her family, (6) the visiting man brought to the family, and (7) a subsequent marriage.

Robert Wilson noted that the language  and  use to report God's deliverance of Israel from Egypt is echoed in the language 1 Samuel  uses to report Saul’s elevation.

Exodus chapter 4
The Hebrew Bible reports skin disease (tzara'at) and a person affected by skin disease (metzora) at several places, often (and sometimes incorrectly) translated as "leprosy" and "a leper." In , to help Moses to convince others that God had sent him, God instructed Moses to put his hand into his bosom, and when he took it out, his hand was "leprous (m'tzora'at), as white as snow." In , the Torah sets out regulations for skin disease (tzara'at) and a person affected by skin disease (metzora). In , after Miriam spoke against Moses, God's cloud removed from the Tent of Meeting and "Miriam was leprous (m'tzora'at), as white as snow." In , Moses warned the Israelites in the case of skin disease (tzara'at) diligently to observe all that the priests would teach them, remembering what God did to Miriam. In  (part of the haftarah for parashah Tazria), the prophet Elisha cures Naaman, the commander of the army of the king of Aram, who was a "leper" (metzora). In  (part of the haftarah for parashah Metzora), the story is told of four "leprous men" (m'tzora'im) at the gate during the Arameans' siege of Samaria. And in 2 Chronicles , after King Uzziah tried to burn incense in the Temple in Jerusalem, "leprosy (tzara'at) broke forth on his forehead."

In early nonrabbinic interpretation
The parashah has parallels or is discussed in these early nonrabbinic sources:

Exodus chapter 1
Philo explained that Pharaoh ordered that girl babies be allowed to live, because women were disinclined and unfit for war, and Pharaoh ordered that boy babies be destroyed, because an abundance of men could be "a fortress difficult to take and difficult to destroy".

Chapter 2
Josephus reported that Pharaoh's daughter, named Thermuthis, saw Moses to be so remarkable a child that she adopted him as her son, having no child of her own. Once she carried Moses to her father Pharaoh, showed Moses to Pharaoh, and said that she thought to make Moses her successor, if she should have no legitimate child of her own. Pharaoh's daughter said that Moses was of a divine form and a generous mind, that she had received him from the river, and that she thought it proper to adopt him and make him the heir of Pharaoh's kingdom. She put the child into Pharaoh's hands, and Pharaoh hugged him and on his daughter's account, in a pleasant way, put his crown on the child’s head. But Moses threw the crown down on the ground and stepped on it. When the scribe saw this, he tried to kill Moses, crying that this child was the one foretold, that if the Egyptians killed him, they would no longer be in danger. The scribe said that Moses himself attested to the prediction by trampling on Pharaoh's crown. The scribe called on Pharaoh to take Moses away, and deliver the Egyptians from fear. But Pharaoh's daughter prevented the scribe and snatched Moses away. And Pharaoh did not order Moses killed, for God inclined Pharaoh to spare him.

Chapter 3
Philo told that when Moses was leading his flock, he came upon a grove in a valley, where he saw a bush that was suddenly set ablaze without anyone setting fire to it. Being entirely enveloped by the flame, as though the fire proceeded from a fountain showering fire over it, it nevertheless remained whole without being consumed, as if it were taking the fire for its own fuel. In the middle of the flame there was a beautiful form, a most Godlike image, emitting a light more brilliant than fire, which anyone might have imagined to be the image of the living God. But Philo said to call it an angel, because it merely related the events which were about to happen in a silence more distinct than any voice. For the burning bush was a symbol of the oppressed people, and the burning fire was a symbol of the oppressors. And the circumstance of the burning bush not being consumed symbolized that the people thus oppressed would not be destroyed by those who were attacking them, but that their hostility would be unsuccessful and fruitless. The angel was the emblem of the Providence of God.

In classical rabbinic interpretation
The parashah is discussed in these rabbinic sources from the era of the Mishnah and the Talmud:

Exodus chapter 1
Rabbi Simeon ben Yoḥai deduced from  that the Shechinah was with the Israelites when they were exiled to Egypt, and that the Shechinah went with the Israelites wherever they were exiled demonstrated how beloved the Israelites were in the sight of God.

A Midrash deduced from the words "these are the names of the sons of Israel" in  that Israel is equal in importance to God with the host of heaven. For  says "names," and  also says "names" in reference to the stars when it says of God, "He counts the number of the stars; He gives them all their names." So when Israel came down to Egypt, God also counted their number. Because they were likened to stars, God called them all by their names. Hence  says, "these are the names."

The Sifre asked why  makes special note of Joseph, saying "Joseph was in Egypt already," when the reader would already know this. The Sifre explained that Scripture meant thereby to tell of Joseph's righteousness. Joseph was shepherding Jacob's flock, and even though Pharaoh made Joseph like a king in Egypt, he remained Joseph in his righteousness.

As  reports that "Joseph died, and all his brethren," a Midrash reports that the Rabbis concluded that Joseph died before his brothers. Rabbi Judah haNasi taught that Joseph died before his brothers because Joseph "commanded his servants the physicians to embalm his father" (as  reports). But the Rabbis taught that Jacob had directed his sons to embalm him, as  reports that "his sons did to him as he commanded them."

Another Midrash said that each woman bore 12 children at every birth, because the word "fruitful" (paru) implies two, "multiplied" (va-yisheretzu) another two, "increased" (va-yirbu) another two, "grew" (va-ye'atzmu) another two, "greatly, greatly" (bi-me'od me'od) another two, and "the land was filled with them" (va-timalei ha'aretz otam) another two, making 12 in all.

The Gemara cited  to help demonstrate that God always fulfills God's promises. In , God promised Moses, "Leave Me alone; I will destroy them and blot out their name from under heaven; and I will make from you a nation mightier and greater than they." Even though Moses prayed to have the decree to blot out the Israelites' name repealed, and God did nullify that decree, God fulfilled God's promise that Moses' descendants would become a nation mightier and greater than the 600,000 Israelites in the desert.  says, "The sons of Moses: Gershom and Eliezer . . . and the sons of Eliezer were Reḥaviya the chief. And Eliezer had no other sons; and the sons of Reḥaviya were very many." And Rav Yosef bar Ḥiyya taught in a Baraita that that one can deduce from Scripture's use of the same word "very many" in both  and  that "very many" means more than 600,000. With regard to Reḥaviya's sons,  says that they "were very many." And  says that "the children of Israel became numerous and multiplied and were very many." Just as when the children of Israel were in Egypt, "very many" meant that there were more than 600,000 of them, Rav Yosef reasoned that so too the descendants of Moses' descendant Reḥaviya must have numbered more than 600,000.

Rabbi Jeremiah taught that "vine" referred to the Jewish people, as  says, "You plucked up a vine out of Egypt; You drove out the nations and planted it."

The Tosefta deduced from  that as long as Joseph and his brothers were alive, the Israelites enjoyed greatness and honor, but after Joseph died (as reported in ), a new Pharaoh arose who took counsel against the Israelites (as reported in ).

One said that the "new" Pharaoh who did not know Joseph really was a different person, reading the word "new" literally. The other said that only Pharaoh's decrees were new, as nowhere does the text state that the former Pharaoh died and the new Pharaoh reigned in his stead.

The Israelites' affliction
The Tosefta deduced from  that Pharaoh began to sin first before the people, and thus God struck him first, but the rest did not escape.

Rabbi Ḥama bar Ḥanina said that Pharaoh meant by that: "Come, let us outwit the Savior of Israel." Pharaoh then considered with what to afflict them. Pharaoh reasoned that if the Egyptians afflicted the Israelites with fire, then  indicates that God would punish the Egyptians with fire. If the Egyptians afflicted the Israelites with the sword, then  indicates that God would punish the Egyptians with the sword. The Egyptians failed to note that while God had sworn not to bring another flood on the whole world, God could still bring a flood on only one people. This all bore out what Rabbi Eleazar said: In the pot in which they cooked, they were themselves cooked—that is, with the punishment that the Egyptians intended for the Israelites, the Egyptians were themselves punished.

Rabbi Hiyya bar Abba said in the name of Rabbi Simai that Balaam, Job, and Jethro stood in Pharaoh's council when he formulated this plan against the Israelites. Balaam devised the plan and was slain; Job acquiesced and was afflicted with sufferings; and Jethro fled Pharaoh's council and thus merited that his descendants should sit in the Hall of Hewn Stones as members of the Sanhedrin.

The Gemara reasoned that Pharaoh's concern should have been that "we [the Egyptians] will leave the land." Rabbi Abba bar Kahana concluded that the usage was like that of a man who fears a curse on himself but speaks euphemistically in terms of a curse on somebody else.

The Gemara noted that  used the singular in "they set taskmasters over him," when the text should have read "over them." The School of Rabbi Eleazar ben Simeon deduced from this that the Egyptians hung a brick mold round Pharaoh's neck, and whenever an Israelite complained that he was weak, they would ask him, "Are you weaker than Pharaoh?" The Gemara thus noted the similarity between the Hebrew word "taskmasters" ("missim") and something that forms ("mesim").

The Gemara noted that  used the singular in "to afflict him with their burdens," when the text should have read "them." The Gemara deduced from this that the verse foretold that Pharaoh would be afflicted with the burdens of Israel.

One said that they were called that because they endangered (mesakkenot) their owners, while the other said it was because they impoverished (memaskenot) their owners, for a master had declared that whoever occupies himself with building becomes impoverished.

One said that the single city's real name was Pithom, but it was called Raamses because one building after another collapsed (mitroses). The other said that its real name was Raamses, but it was called Pithom because the mouth of the deep (pi tehom) swallowed up one building after another.

Resh Lakish interpreted the verse to teach that at the time, the Divine Spirit foretold to them that this would be the result of the affliction.

But Rabbi Samuel bar Nahmani interpreted the words to mean "with rigorous work (perikah)."

Rabbi Ahawa the son of Rabbi Ze'ira taught that just as lettuce is sweet at the beginning (in the leaf) and bitter at the end (in the stalk), so were the Egyptians sweet to the Israelites at the beginning and bitter at the end. The Egyptians were sweet at the beginning, as  reports that Pharaoh told Joseph, "The land of Egypt is before you; have your father and brethren dwell in the best of the land." And the Egyptians were bitter at the end, as  reports, "And they (the Egyptians) made their (the Israelites') lives bitter."

Rava interpreted  to teach that at first, the Egyptians made the Israelites' lives bitter with mortar and brick, but finally it was with all manner of service in the field. Rabbi Samuel bar Nahmani said in the name of Rabbi Jonathan that the Egyptians assigned men's work to the women and women's work to the men.

At first, he commanded the taskmasters to insist that the Israelites make the prescribed number of bricks. Then he commanded that the taskmasters not allow the Israelites to sleep in their homes, intending by this to limit their ability to have children. The taskmasters told the Israelites that if they went home to sleep, they would lose a few hours each morning from work and never complete the allotted number or bricks, as  reports: "And the taskmasters were urgent, saying: ‘Fulfill your work.'" So the Israelites slept on the ground in the brickyard. God told the Egyptians that God had promised the Israelites' ancestor Abraham that God would multiply his children like the stars, as in  God promised Abraham: "That in blessing I will bless you, and in multiplying, I will multiply your seed as the stars of the heaven." But now the Egyptians were cunningly planning that the Israelites not increase. So God set about to see that God's word prevail, and immediately  reports: "But the more they afflicted them, the more they multiplied." When Pharaoh saw that the Israelites increased abundantly despite his decrees, he then decreed concerning the male children, as  reports: "And the king of Egypt spoke to the Hebrew midwives . . . and he said: ‘When you do the office of a midwife to the Hebrew women, you shall look upon the birthstool: if it be a son, then you shall kill him.'" So finally (as  reports), "Pharaoh charged all his people, saying: ‘Every son that is born you shall cast into the river.'"

The righteous midwives
Rav Awira taught that God delivered the Israelites from Egypt as the reward for the righteous women who lived in that generation. When the righteous women went to draw water, God caused small fish to enter their pitchers. When they drew up their pitchers, they were half full of water and half full of fishes. They set two pots on the fire, one of water and the other of fish. They carried the pots to their husbands in the field.

The Gemara interpreted  to teach that as the reward for lying among the sheepfolds, the Israelites merited the Egyptians' spoils, noting that  speaks of "a dove covered with silver, and her pinions with yellow gold."

The Gemara taught that when the Israelite women conceived, they returned to their homes, and when the time for childbirth arrived, they delivered beneath apple trees, as reflected in Song of Songs .

One said that they were mother and daughter, and the other said that they were mother-in-law and daughter-in-law. According to the one who said that they were mother and daughter, they were Jochebed and Miriam; and according to the one who said that they were mother-in-law and daughter-in-law, they were Jochebed and Elisheba, who married Aaron. A Baraita taught in accordance with the one who said that they were mother and daughter, teaching that Jochebed was called Shiphrah because she straightened (meshapperet) the limbs of the newborns. Another explanation was that she was called Shiphrah because the Israelites were fruitful (sheparu) and multiplied in her days. Miriam was called Puah because she cried out (po'ah) to the unborn children to bring them out. Another explanation was that she was called Puah because she cried out (po'ah) with the Divine Spirit to say: "My mother will bear a son who will save Israel."

The Gemara interpreted the words that Pharaoh spoke in  "When you do the office of a midwife to the Hebrew women, you shall look upon the birthstool (obnayim). Rabbi Hanan taught that Pharaoh gave the midwives a sign that when a woman bent to deliver a child, her thighs would grow cold like stones (abanim). Just as a potter would have a thigh on one side, a thigh on the other side, and the block in between, so also a woman giving birth would have a thigh on one side, a thigh on the other side, and the child in between.

Rabbi Hanina deduced from the words "If it is a son, then you shall kill him" in  that Pharaoh gave the midwives a sign that when a woman was to give birth to a son, the baby's face was turned downward, and if a daughter, the baby's face was turned upward.

Rabbi Jose son of Rabbi Hanina deduced from the words "to them" in  that Pharaoh propositioned the midwives, but they refused him.

The Gemara interpreted the midwives' response to Pharaoh in  that the Israelite women "are lively (chayot)" to mean that they told him that the Israelites were like animals (chayot), for  called Judah "a lion's whelp,"  called Dan "a serpent,"  called Naphtali "a hind let loose,"  called Issachar "a strong ass,"  called Joseph "a firstling bullock,"  called Benjamin "a wolf that devours," and  called the mother of all of them "a lioness."

Rav and Samuel differed in their interpretation of the report in  that "because the midwives feared God," God "made them houses." One said that God made them the ancestors of the priestly and Levitical houses, as Aaron and Moses were children of Jochebed. And the other said that God made them the ancestors of the royal house of Israel, teaching that Caleb married Miriam, whom 1 Chronicles  calls Ephrath, and  reports that David was the son of an Ephrathite.

The Tosefta deduced from  that the Egyptians took pride before God only on account of the water of the Nile, and thus God exacted punishment from them only by water when in  God cast Pharaoh's chariots and army into the Reed Sea.

Rabbi Jose son of Rabbi Hanina deduced from the words "Pharaoh charged all his people" in  that Pharaoh imposed the same decree on his own people as well as the Israelites.

Exodus chapter 2
Rav Judah bar Zebina taught that he followed the counsel of his daughter. A Baraita taught that when Amram heard that Pharaoh had decreed (as reported in ) that "every son that is born you shall cast into the river," Amram concluded that having children was in vain, he divorced his wife, and all the Israelite men followed suit and divorced their wives. But Amram's daughter told him that his decree was more severe than Pharaoh's, as Pharaoh's decree affected only sons, while Amram's decree affected both sons and daughters. Pharaoh's decree affected only this world, but Amram's decree deprived children of both this world and the world to come. And doubt existed whether Pharaoh's decree would be fulfilled, but because Amram was righteous, it was certain that his decree would be fulfilled. Persuaded by her arguments, Amram took back his wife, and the Israelite men followed suit and took back their wives. The Gemara thus asked why  reported that Amram "took to wife" Jochebed when it should have read that he took her back. Rav Judah bar Zebina taught that Amram remarried Jochebed as though it were their first marriage; he seated her in a sedan chair as was the custom for first brides, Aaron and Miriam danced before her, and the ministering angels called her (in the words of ) "a joyful mother of children."

Even though this would thus make her by the Gemara's calculation 130 years old, Rav Judah taught that she was called "a daughter" because the characteristics of a young woman were reborn in her.

The Gemara ask how then  should report "the woman conceived and bore a son" when she had already been pregnant three months. Rav Judah bar Zebina explained that  thus meant to compare Jochebed's delivery of Moses to his conception; as his conception was painless, so was his birth.

Rabbi Judah said that his name was Tobiah, meaning "God is good." Rabbi Nehemiah deduced from the word "good" that Jochebed foresaw that Moses could be a prophet. Others said that he was born needing no further improvement, and thus that he was born circumcised.

The Gemara asked why it was (as reported in ) that "she could not longer hide him." The Gemara explained that whenever the Egyptians were informed that a child was born, they would take other children into the neighborhood so that the newborn should hear the other children crying and cry along with them, thus disclosing the newborn's location.

Rabbi Eleazar explained that Jochebed's choice of bulrushes—a cheap material—for the ark (as reported in ) demonstrated that righteous people's money is dearer to them than their bodies, so that they should not be driven to steal. Rabbi Samuel bar Nahmani explained that she chose bulrushes for the ark because they provided a soft material that could withstand encounters with soft and hard materials alike.

A Baraita taught that Jochebed "daubed it with slime and with pitch" (as reported in ) with the slime on the inside and the pitch on outside so that the righteous baby Moses would not be subjected to the bad odor of the pitch.

The Sages taught in a Baraita in the Babylonian Talmud that seven prophetesses prophesied on behalf of the Jewish people. The Gemara identified them as Sarah, Miriam, Deborah, Hannah, Abigail, Huldah, and Esther. The Gemara explained that Miriam was a prophetess, as  says explicitly: “And Miriam the prophetess, the sister of Aaron, took a timbrel in her hand.” The Gemara asked why this verse mentions only Aaron and not Moses. Rav Naḥman said that Rav said that she prophesied when she was only Aaron’s sister, before Moses was born, saying that her mother was destined to bear a son who would deliver the Jewish people to salvation. When Moses was born, the entire house was filled with light, and her father stood and kissed her on the head and told her that her prophecy had been fulfilled. But when Moses was cast into the river, her father patted her on the head, asking what had become of her prophecy, as it looked as though Moses would soon meet his end. That is why  reports: “And his sister stood at a distance to know what would be done to him,” for Miriam wanted to know how her prophecy would be fulfilled. The Mekhilta reported that Miriam had told her father that he was destined to have a son who would save Israel from the hands of the Egyptians.

The Mishnah cited  for the proposition that Providence treats a person measure for measure as that person treats others. The Tosefta taught that a reward for good deeds is 500 times greater than the punishment for retribution. Abaye thus said that in connection with good deeds, the principle of measure for measure does not apply strictly with equivalence. Rava replied that the Mishnah taught, "It is the same in connection with the good," so the Mishnah must mean that Providence rewards good deeds with the same sort of measure, but the measure of reward for good is greater than the measure of punishment.

Rabbi Isaac noted that  used several words associated elsewhere in Scripture with the Shechinah, and deduced that the Divine Presence thus stood with Miriam as she watched over the baby Moses.

Rabbi Judan said in the name of Rabbi Isaac that God saved Moses from Pharaoh's sword. Reading , Rabbi Yannai asked whether it was possible for a person of flesh and blood to escape from a government. Rather, Rabbi Yannai said that Pharaoh caught Moses and sentenced him to be beheaded. Just as the executioner brought down his sword, Moses' neck became like an ivory tower (as described in ) and broke the sword. Rabbi Judah haNasi said in the name of Rabbi Evyasar that the sword flew off of Moses' neck and killed the executioner. The Gemara cited  to support this deduction, reading the words "and delivered me" as superfluous unless they were necessary to show that God saved Moses but not the executioner. Rabbi Berechyah cited the executioner's fate as an application of the proposition of  that a wicked ransoms a righteous one, and Rabbi Avun cited it for the same proposition applying . In a second explanation of how Moses escaped, Bar Kappara taught a Baraita that an angel came down from heaven in the likeness of Moses, they seized the angel, and Moses escaped. In a third explanation of how Moses escaped, Rabbi Joshua ben Levi said that when Moses fled from Pharaoh, God incapacitated Pharaoh's people by making some of them mute, some of them deaf, and some of them blind. When Pharaoh asked where Moses was, the mutes could not reply, the deaf could not hear, and the blind could not see. And it was this event to which God referred in  when God asked Moses who made men mute or deaf or blind.

Rabbi Eleazar deduced from  that God redeemed the Israelites from Egypt for five reasons: (1) distress, as  reports, "the children of Israel sighed by reason of the bondage"; (2) repentance, as  reports, "and their cry came up to God"; (3) the merits of the Patriarchs, as  reports, "and God remembered His covenant with Abraham, with Isaac, and with Jacob"; (4) God's mercy, as  reports, "and God saw the children of Israel"; and (5) the term of their slavery having come to an end, as  reports, "and God took cognizance of them."

Exodus chapter 3
Interpreting , a Midrash taught that God tested Moses through his experience as a shepherd. Our Rabbis said that when Moses was tending Jethro's flock in the wilderness, a little kid escaped. Moses ran after the kid until it reached a shady place, where the kid stopped to drink at a pool of water. Moses reasoned that the kid had run away because it was thirsty and concluded that the kid must be weary. So Moses carried the kid back on his shoulder. Thereupon God decided that because Moses had mercy leading a person's flock, Moses would assuredly tend God's flock Israel. Hence  says, "Now Moses was keeping the flock."

God therefore took Moses to tend Israel, as  says, "You led Your people like a flock, by the hand of Moses and Aaron."

A Midrash taught that when God first spoke to Moses (through the angel at the beginning of ), Moses was at first unwilling to desist from his work. So God therefore showed Moses the burning bush, so that Moses might turn his face to see (such a striking phenomenon) and speak with God. Thus  says at first, "And the angel of the Lord appeared to him," and yet Moses did not go to see. But as soon as Moses stopped his work and went to see (in ), God (and not merely the angel) immediately called to Moses.

Rabbi Yannai taught that just as if one twin has a pain, the other feels it also, so God said, (in ), "I will be with him in trouble." Similarly, a Midrash taught that as  says, "In all their affliction He was afflicted." And thus God asked Moses to realize that God lives in trouble just as the Israelites live in trouble, and that Moses could see from the place from which God spoke to Moses—from the thorn-bush—that God was a partner in their trouble.

Reading , "And the angel of the Lord appeared," Rabbi Rabbi Joḥanan said that it was Michael, while Rabbi Hanina said that it was Gabriel.

Rav Joseph taught that a person should always learn from the Creator; for God ignored all the mountains and heights and caused the Divine Presence (Shechinah) to abide upon Mount Sinai, and ignored all the beautiful trees and caused the Divine Presence (Shechinah) to abide in a bush (as reported in ). (Similarly, people should practice humility.)

Midrash Tanḥuma explained that before the Israelites erected the Tabernacle, God spoke to Moses from the burning bush, as  says, "God called to him out of the bush." After that, God spoke to Moses in Midian, as  says, "The Lord said to Moses in Midian." After that, God spoke to Moses in Egypt, as  says, "The Lord said to Moses and Aaron in the land of Egypt." After that, God spoke to Moses at Sinai, as  says, "The Lord spoke to Moses in the wilderness of Sinai." Once the Israelites erected the Tabernacle, God said, "modesty is beautiful," as  says, "and to walk humbly with your God,” and God began talking with Moses in the Tent of Meeting.

A Baraita taught that a person should not enter the Temple Mount either with a staff in hand or shoe on foot, or with money tied up in a cloth, or with a money bag slung over a shoulder, and should not take a short cut through the Temple Mount. The Baraita taught that spitting on the Temple Mount is forbidden a fortiori from the case of wearing a shoe. The Baraita deduced that the rule must apply all the more to spitting, which does show contempt. But Rabbi Jose bar Judah said that this reasoning was unnecessary, for  says, "none may enter within the king's gate clothed in sackcloth." And thus one may deduce a fortiori that if that is the rule for sackcloth, which is not in itself disgusting, and before an earthly king, how much more would that be the rule with spitting, which is in itself disgusting, and before the supreme King of Kings!

But Rabbi Samuel bar Nahmani said in the name of Rabbi Jonathan that in compensation for three pious acts that Moses did at the burning bush, he was privileged to obtain three rewards.

Once when Rami bar Ezekiel visited Bnei Brak, he saw goats grazing under fig trees while honey was flowing from the figs, and milk dripped from the goats mingling with the fig honey, causing him to remark that it was indeed a land flowing with milk and honey. Rabbi Jacob ben Dostai said that it is about three miles from Lod to Ono, and once he rose up early in the morning and waded all that way up to his ankles in fig honey. Resh Lakish said that he saw the flow of the milk and honey of Sepphoris extend over an area of sixteen miles by sixteen miles. Rabbah bar Bar Hana said that he saw the flow of the milk and honey in all the Land of Israel and the total area was equal to an area of twenty-two parasangs by six parasangs.

Rabbi Jacob bar Avina in the name of Rabbi Huna of Sepphoris interpreted “I Am That I Am” to mean that God told Moses to tell them that God would be with them in this servitude, and in servitude they would always continue, but God would be with them. Moses asked God whether he should tell them this, asking whether the evil of the hour was not sufficient. Moses asked God whether he should tell them this, and God replied “No, but ‘I Am has sent me to you.’” Rabbi Joḥanan taught that God said, “‘I am that I am’ to individuals, but as for the mass, I rule over them even against their desire and will, even though they break their teeth, as it is said (in ) ‘“As I live,” says the Lord God, “surely with a mighty hand and with an outstretched arm, and with fury poured out, will I be King over you.”’” Rabbi Ananiel bar Rabbi Sasson taught that God said, “When I so wish it, one of the angels who is a third of the world stretches out his hand from heaven and touches the earth, as it says (in ): ‘And the form of a hand was put forth, and I was taken by a lock of my head.’ And when I desire it, I make those of them sit beneath a tree, as it is said (in ): ‘And recline yourselves under the tree’; and when I desire, His glory fills the whole world, as it is said (in ), ‘Do not I fill heaven and earth? says the Lord.’” And when I wished, I spoke with Job from the whirlwind, as it is said (in ), ‘Then the Lord answered Job out of the whirlwind,’ and when I wish, I speak from a thorn-bush (contracting or expanding at will).”

A certain old man told Rava that one can read  to say, "This is My Name, to be hidden." Rabbi Avina taught that God said that God's Name is not pronounced as The Name is written: The Name is written , YHWH, and read , Adonai. Reading , "And the Lord shall be King over all the earth; in that day shall the Lord be One, and His name one," Rav Nahman bar Isaac taught that the future world will not be like this world. In this world God's Name is written , YHWH, and read , Adonai, but in the future world God's Name shall all be one: It shall be written , YHWH, and read , YHWH.

Rabbi Ḥama bar Ḥanina taught that our ancestors were never without a scholars' council. Abraham was an elder and a member of the scholars' council, as  says, "And Abraham was an elder well stricken in age." Eliezer, Abraham's servant, was an elder and a member of the scholars' council, as  says, "And Abraham said to his servant, the elder of his house, who ruled over all he had," which Rabbi Eleazar explained to mean that he ruled over—and thus knew and had control of—the Torah of his master. Isaac was an elder and a member of the scholars' council, as  says: "And it came to pass when Isaac was an elder." Jacob was an elder and a member of the scholars' council, as  says, "Now the eyes of Israel were dim with age." In Egypt they had the scholars' council, as  says, "Go and gather the elders of Israel together."

Rabbi Eliezer taught that the five Hebrew letters of the Torah that alone among Hebrew letters have two separate shapes (depending whether they are in the middle or the end of a word)— (Kh, M, N, P, Z)—all relate to the mystery of the redemption. With the letter tsade, God will redeem Israel from the oppression of the kingdoms, and God will say to Israel, I have caused a branch to spring forth for you, as  says, "Behold, the man whose name is the Branch (zemach); and he shall grow up (yizmach) out of his place, and he shall build the temple of the Lord." These letters were delivered to Abraham. Jacob's son Asher delivered the mystery of the Redemption to his daughter Serah. When Moses and Aaron came to the elders of Israel and performed signs in their sight, the elders told Serah. She told them that there is no reality in signs. The elders told her that Moses said, "God will surely visit (pakod yifkod) you" (as in ). Serah told the elders that Moses was the one who would redeem Israel from Egypt, for she heard (in the words of ), "I have surely visited (pakod pakadeti) you." The people immediately believed in God and Moses, as  says, "And the people believed, and when they heard that the Lord had visited the children of Israel."

Exodus chapter 4
Resh Lakish taught that Providence punishes bodily those who unjustifiably suspect the innocent. In , Moses said that the Israelites "will not believe me," but God knew that the Israelites would believe. God thus told Moses that the Israelites were believers and descendants of believers, while Moses would ultimately disbelieve. The Gemara explained that  reports that "the people believed" and  reports that the Israelites' ancestor Abraham "believed in the Lord," while  reports that Moses "did not believe." Thus, Moses was smitten when in  God turned his hand white as snow.

The Mishnah counted the miraculous rod of  among ten things that God created at twilight at the end of the sixth day of creation.

Rabbi Samuel bar Nahman taught that Moses first incurred his fate to die in the wilderness from his conduct at the Burning Bush, for there God tried for seven days to persuade Moses to go on his errand to Egypt, as  says, “And Moses said to the Lord: ‘Oh Lord, I am not a man of words, neither yesterday, nor the day before, nor since you have spoken to your servant’” (which the Midrash interpreted to indicate seven days of conversation). Rabbi Berekiah in Rabbi Levi's name and Rabbi Helbo give different answers on when God repaid Moses.

The Midrash taught that when Moses first came to Jethro, he swore that he would not depart without Jethro's knowledge. Thus when God commissioned Moses to return to Egypt, Moses first went to ask Jethro to absolve him of his oath.

Rabbi Levi bar Hitha taught that one bidding farewell to a living friend should not say, "Go in peace (lech b'shalom)" but "Go unto peace (lech l'shalom)."

Rabbi Joḥanan said on the authority of Rabbi Simeon ben Yoḥai that wherever the Torah mentions "quarrelling" (nizzim), the Torah refers to Dathan and Abiram. Thus the Gemara identified as Dathan and Abiram the men whom  reports sought the life of Moses. Resh Lakish further explained that they had not actually died, as  appears to report, but had become impoverished, for (as a Baraita taught) the impoverished are considered as if they were dead (for they have similarly little influence in the world). The Baraita taught that four types of people are accounted as though they were dead: a poor person, a person affected by skin disease (a metzora), a blind person, and one who is childless. A poor person is accounted as dead, for  says, "for all the men are dead who sought your life" (and the Gemara interpreted this to mean that they had been stricken with poverty). A person affected by skin disease (metzora) is accounted as dead, for  says, "And Aaron looked upon Miriam, and behold, she was leprous (metzora'at). And Aaron said to Moses . . . let her not he as one dead." The blind are accounted as dead, for  says, "He has set me in dark places, as they that be dead of old."

Where the Hebrew of  says, "And Moses took his wife and his sons, and set them upon a donkey," the Baraita reported that the Greek translation said, "And Moses took his wife and his children, and made them ride on a carrier of men," so as to preserve the dignity of Moses.

A non-Jew asked Shammai to convert him to Judaism on condition that Shammai appoint him High Priest. Shammai pushed him away with a builder's ruler. The non-Jew then went to Hillel, who converted him. Hillel answered that it applied even to David, King of Israel, who had not been a priest. Thereupon the convert reasoned a fortiori that if the injunction applied to all (non-priestly) Israelites, whom in  God had called "my firstborn," how much more so would the injunction apply to a mere convert, who came among the Israelites with just his staff and bag. Then the convert returned to Shammai, quoted the injunction, and remarked on how absurd it had been for him to ask Shammai to appoint him High Priest.

A Baraita taught that Rabbi Joshua ben Karha said that great is circumcision, for all the meritorious deeds performed by Moses did not protect him when he delayed circumcising his son Eliezer, and that failure brought about what  reports: "and the Lord met him, and sought to kill him." Rabbi Jose, however, taught that Moses was not apathetic towards circumcision, but reasoned that if he circumcised his son and then immediately left on his mission to Pharaoh, he would endanger his son's life. Moses wondered whether he should circumcise his son and wait three days, but God had commanded him (in ) to "return into Egypt." According to Rabbi Jose, God sought to punish Moses because Moses busied himself first with securing lodging at an inn (rather than seeing to the circumcision), as  reports, "And it came to pass on the way at the lodging-place." Rabban Simeon ben Gamaliel taught that the Accuser did not seek to slay Moses but Eliezer, for  reports, "Then Zipporah took a flint, and cut off the foreskin of her son, and cast it at his feet; and she said: ‘Surely a bridegroom of blood are you to me.'" Rabban Simeon ben Gamaliel reasoned that the one who could be called "a bridegroom of blood" was the infant who had been circumcised. Rabbi Judah bar Bizna taught that when Moses delayed circumcising Eliezer, two angels named Af (Anger) and Ḥemah (Wrath) came and swallowed Moses up, leaving nothing but his legs unconsumed. Zipporah deduced from the angels' leaving the lower part of Moses exposed that the danger stemmed from failing to circumcise Eliezer, and (in the words of ) she "took a sharp stone and cut off the foreskin of her son," and right away Af and Ḥemah let Moses go. At that moment, Moses wanted to kill Af and Ḥemah, as  says, "Cease from anger (Af) and forsake wrath (Ḥemah)." Some say that Moses did kill Ḥemah, as  says, "I have not wrath (Ḥemah)." But  says, "I was afraid of anger (Af) and wrath (Ḥemah)," so the two must have been alive at that later time. The Gemara posited that there might have been two angels named Ḥemah. Alternatively, the Gemara suggested that Moses may have killed one of Ḥemah's legions.

The Gemara taught that Moses went to her to ask where the Egyptians had buried Joseph. She told him that the Egyptians had made a metal coffin for Joseph. The Egyptians set the coffin in the Nile so that its waters would be blessed. Moses went to the bank of the Nile and called to Joseph that the time had arrived for God to deliver the Israelites, and the oath that Joseph had imposed upon the children of Israel in  had reached its time of fulfillment. Moses called on Joseph to show himself, and Joseph's coffin immediately rose to the surface of the water. Similarly, a Midrash taught that Serah conveyed to the Israelites a secret password handed down from Jacob so that they would recognize their deliverer. The Midrash told that when, as  reports, “Aaron spoke all the words” to the Israelite people, “And the people believed,” as  reports, they did not believe only because they had seen the signs. Rather, as  reports, “They heard that the Lord had visited”—they believed because they heard, not because they saw the signs. What made them believe was the sign of God's visitation that God communicated to them through a tradition from Jacob, which Jacob handed down to Joseph, Joseph to his brothers, and Asher, the son of Jacob, handed down to his daughter Serah, who was still alive at the time of Moses and Aaron. Asher told Serah that any redeemer who would come and say the password to the Israelites would be their true deliverer. So when Moses came and said the password, the people believed him at once.

Exodus chapter 5
While the House of Shammai argued that the requirement for the appearance offering was greater than that for the festival offering, the House of Hillel cited  to show that the festival offering applied both before and after the revelation at Mount Sinai, and thus its requirement was greater than that for the appearance offering.

The Midrash taught that the words, "A man's pride shall bring him low," apply to Pharaoh, who in  haughtily asked, "Who is the Lord that I should hearken to His voice?" and so, as  reports, God "overthrew Pharaoh and his host."

The Pharisees noted that while in  Pharaoh asked who God was, once God had smitten him, in  Pharaoh acknowledged that God was righteous. Citing this juxtaposition, the Pharisees complained against heretics who placed the name of earthly rulers above the name of God.

Rabbi Nechunia, son of Hakkanah, cited Pharaoh as an example of the power of repentance. God thus delivered Pharaoh from the dead.

In medieval Jewish interpretation
The parashah is discussed in these medieval Jewish sources:

Exodus chapter 2

Maimonides read , “men of power,” to imply that judges should have a courageous heart to save the oppressed from the oppressor, as  reports, “And Moses arose and delivered them.”

Exodus chapter 3
Thus, God identified God's self to the Israelites through the way that they gained knowledge of God—the traditions of their ancestors from whom they inherited it, as  states, "For I (God) have known him (Abraham), to the end that he may command his children and his household after him, that they may keep the way of the Lord, to do righteousness and justice." Baḥya suggested that it might also be possible that God revealed God's self to them through their ancestors because their ancestors alone in their generations served God when all around them worshipped other "gods" (like idols, the sun, the moon, or money). For God did not establish any other way to know God except through (1) that which intellectual reason testifies through the evidence of God's deeds that are manifest in God's creations and (2) that of ancestral tradition.

Exodus chapter 4
The offender would thus be prevented from doing repentance, and would not have the power to return from the offense, and the offender would die and be lost because of the offense. Similarly  reports, "They ridiculed the messengers of God, disdained His words and insulted His prophets until the anger of God rose upon the people, without possibility of healing." Maimonides interpreted these verses to teach that they sinned willingly and to such an egregious extent that they deserved to have repentance withheld from them. Maimonides explained that God sent Moses to tell Pharaoh to send out the Jews and do repentance, when God had already told Moses that Pharaoh would refuse, because God sought to inform humanity that when God withholds repentance from a sinner, the sinner will not be able to repent. Maimonides made clear that God did not decree that Pharaoh harm the Jewish people; rather, Pharaoh sinned willfully on his own, and he thus deserved to have the privilege of repentance withheld from him.

In modern interpretation
The parashah is discussed in these modern sources:

Exodus chapter 1
Noting that  does not identify the Pharaoh involved, Nahum Sarna wrote that the term “Pharaoh” in ancient Egyptian meant simply “The Great House.” The term originally applied to the royal palace and court, but late in the 18th Dynasty, Egyptians came to employ it by metonymy for the reigning monarch, just as English speakers would use “The White House” or “City Hall” today. Walter Brueggemann noted that while  does not name the Pharaoh,  does name the defiant midwives Shiphrah and Puah.

Plaut reported that scholars generally agree that the term “Hebrew” (Ivri) came from the name of a group called Habiru or Apiru, people who had lost their status in the community from which they came, and who were not necessarily related except by common fate. Plaut wrote that the Habiru were a class of people who lived in the Fertile Crescent during the 19th to 14th centuries B.C.E. who may originally have come from Arabia, became prominent in Mesopotamia, and later spread to Egypt. The Habiru followed distinct occupations, particularly mercenaries and administrators. Although at first they were nomads or seminomads, they later settled, but were usually considered foreigners and maintaining their group identity. The term Habiru referred not so much to an ethnic or linguistic group as to a social or political group. Plaut reported that the words Habiru and “Hebrew” (Ivri) appear to share a common linguistic root. Plaut concluded that Israelites in Egypt likely occupied positions similar to, or because of familial ties were identified with, the Habiru. When non-Israelites repeatedly applied the term to the Israelites, the Israelites themselves began to use the name Habiru, which they pronounced Ivri. Plaut considered it possible that for some time the term Ivri was used only when the Israelites spoke of themselves to outsiders and when outsiders referred to them.

Exodus chapter 2

Sigmund Freud saw in the story of Moses in the bulrushes in  echoes of a myth of a hero who stands up manfully against his father and in the end overcomes him. The myth traces this struggle back to the dawn of the hero's life, by having him born against his father's will and saved in spite of his father's evil intentions. Freud wrote that the exposure in the basket symbolically represented birth, with the basket as the womb and the stream as the water at birth. Freud wrote that dreams often represent the relation of the child to the parents by drawing or saving from water. A people would attach this myth to a famous person to recognize him as a hero whose life had conformed to the typical plan. Freud explained that the inner source of the myth was the “family romance” of the child, in which the son reacts to the change in his inner relationship to his parents, especially that to his father. In this romance, the child's early years are governed by overestimation of his father, represented by a king in dreams. Later, influenced by rivalry and disappointment, the release from the parents and a critical attitude towards the father sets in. The two families of the myth, the noble as well as the humble one, are therefore both images of the child's own family as they appear to the child in successive periods.

Elie Wiesel argued that Moses ran away from Egypt in  because he was disappointed with his fellow Jews. Pharaoh would not have punished him for killing a lower-class Egyptian or admonishing a Jewish supervisor. There were only three people present when Moses killed the Egyptian—the Egyptian, who could not tell the story, because he was dead; Moses, who had not talked; and the Jew whom Moses had saved, who must have informed on him. When Moses realized this, that must have been when he decided to run away.

Exodus chapter 3

MacDonald wrote that the term for milk (chalav) could easily be the word for "fat" (chelev), and the word for honey (devash) could indicate not bees' honey but a sweet syrup made from fruit. The expression evoked a general sense of the bounty of the land and suggested an ecological richness exhibited in a number of ways, not just with milk and honey. MacDonald noted that the expression was always used to describe a land that the people of Israel had not yet experienced, and thus characterized it as always a future expectation.

Reading , Robert Oden taught that God's Name , Ehyeh Asher Ehyeh, "I am Who I am" or "I will be Who I will be," employed the first person singular form of the verb "to be," and then the four-letter Name of God, YHVH, looks like the third-person masculine singular causitive form of the verb "to be," as in "he who causes to be," which Oden argued was likely part of a longer epithet attached to the Canaanite god El, the high god of the Canaanites. Oden argued that Ehyeh was an alternate, early, ancient version of YHVH that came from a separate, likely Amorite dialect, and was thus the same name. Oden posited that the occasion for the revelation of the four-letter Name of God, YHVH, was the coming together of the 12 tribes of Israel as a new confederation (as described in ).

Exodus chapter 4
Everett Fox noted that “glory” (kevod) and “stubbornness” (kaved lev) are leading words throughout the book of Exodus that give it a sense of unity.

In critical analysis
Some scholars who follow the Documentary Hypothesis find evidence of five separate sources in the parashah. These scholars see the bulk of the story as the weaving together of accounts composed by the Jahwist—(sometimes abbreviated J) who wrote in the south, in the land of the Tribe of Judah, possibly as early as the 10th century BCE—and the Elohist—(sometimes abbreviated E) who wrote in the north, in the land of the Tribe of Ephraim, possibly as early as the second half of the 9th century BCE.
Friedman attributes one small change—making plural the word "sons" in —to the editor (sometimes called the Redactor of JE, or RJE) who combined the Jahwist and Elohist sources in the years following 722 BCE. Friedman then attributes three small insertions— and 13–14; and —to the Priestly source who wrote in the 6th or 5th century BCE. For a similar distribution of verses, see the display of Exodus according to the Documentary Hypothesis at Wikiversity.

Commandments
According to Maimonides and the Sefer ha-Chinuch, there are no commandments in the parashah.

In the liturgy
The Passover Haggadah, in the magid section of the Seder, quotes  to elucidate the report in  that the Israelites had become "great" and "mighty."

Next, the Haggadah cites  to elucidate the report in  that "the Egyptians dealt ill with us [the Israelites], and afflicted us, and laid upon us hard bondage." The Haggadah quotes  for the proposition that the Egyptians attributed evil intentions to the Israelites or dealt ill with them. The Haggadah quotes  for the proposition that the Egyptians afflicted the Israelites. And the Haggadah quotes  for the proposition that the Egyptians imposed hard labor on the Israelites.

Also in the magid section, the Haggadah quotes  to answer the question: For what purpose do Jews eat bitter herbs (maror)? The Haggadah quotes  for the proposition that Jews do so because the Egyptians embittered the Israelites' lives in Egypt.

The Haggadah quotes  to explain the Israelites' travail, interpreting that travail as the loss of the baby boys. The Haggadah quotes  for the proposition that the Israelites cried to God. The Haggadah quotes  for the proposition that God heard the Israelites' voice. The Haggadah quotes  for the proposition that God saw the Israelites' affliction, interpreting that affliction as the suspension of family life. And the Haggadah quotes  to explain the Israelites' oppression, interpreting that oppression as pressure or persecution.

According to a Midrash,  states God's intention in removing Israel from Egyptian slavery when it says, "you shall serve God upon this mountain." And it was to this service that Moses dedicated the Tabernacle, and it was on the day that Moses completed the Tabernacle that Moses composed , which Jews recite in the Pseukei D'Zimrah section of the morning (Shacharit) prayer service.

The exchange of Moses and God in  about God's name is in part about how we as humans can perceive God, and that in turn is one of the motivations of prayer.

The Weekly Maqam
In the Weekly Maqam, Sephardi Jews each week base the songs of the services on the content of that week's parashah. For Parashat Shemot, Sephardi Jews apply Maqam Rast, the maqam that shows a beginning or an initiation of something, as Parashat Shemot initiates the Book of Exodus.

Haftarah

The haftarah for the parashah is:
for Ashkenazi Jews:  and 
for Sephardi Jews:

Ashkenazi—Isaiah 27
The parashah and haftarah in  both address how Israel could prepare for God's deliverance.

Sephardi—Jeremiah 1
The parashah and haftarah in  both report the commissioning of a prophet, Moses in the parashah and Jeremiah in the haftarah. In both the parashah and the haftarah, God calls to the prophet, the prophet resists, citing his lack of capacity, but God encourages the prophet and promises to be with him.

Notes

Further reading
The parashah has parallels or is discussed in these sources:

Ancient
Satire of Trades. Papyrus Sallier II, column VI, lines 1-3 Middle Kingdom of Egypt. (life of bricklayers).
The Legend of Sargon. Assyria, 7th century BCE. In e.g. James B. Pritchard. Ancient Near Eastern Texts Relating to the Old Testament, page 119. Princeton: Princeton University Press, 1969. (child upon the water).

Biblical
 (sojourn in Egypt);  (circumcision);  (abandoned infant);  (courtship at the well);  (courtship at the well).
 (hardening of heart);  (hardening of heart);  (bush).
 (hardening of heart).
 (abandoned infant).
 (God asking who created the world).

Early nonrabbinic
Ezekiel the Tragedian. Exagōgē. 2nd century BCE. Translated by R.G. Robertson. In The Old Testament Pseudepigrapha: Volume 2: Expansions of the "Old Testament" and Legends, Wisdom and Philosophical Literature, Prayers, Psalms, and Odes, Fragments of Lost Judeo-Hellenistic works. Edited by James H. Charlesworth, pages 808–15. New York: Anchor Bible, 1985.
Romans  1st century. (hardening Pharaoh's heart).
2 Timothy  Rome, 67 CE. (magicians opposing Moses).
Hebrews  Late 1st century. (Moses).
Matthew  Late 1st century. (slaughter of the innocents).
Acts  Late 1st century. (Moses).
 Late 1st century. (changing hearts to God's purpose).
Josephus. Antiquities of the Jews 2:9:1–2:13:4. Circa 93–94. In, e.g., The Works of Josephus: Complete and Unabridged, New Updated Edition. Translated by William Whiston, pages 66–73. Peabody, Massachusetts: Hendrickson Publishers, 1987.
Qur'an 20:9–48; 26:10–29; 27:7–12; 28:3–35; 79:15–19. Arabia, 7th century.

Classical rabbinic
Mishnah: Sotah 1:7–9; Avot 5:6; Yadayim 4:8. 3rd century. In, e.g., The Mishnah: A New Translation. Translated by Jacob Neusner, pages 449, 686, 1131. New Haven: Yale University Press, 1988.

Tosefta: Rosh Hashanah 2:13; Chagigah 1:4; Sotah 3:13, 4:12, 10:10. 3rd–4th century. In, e.g., The Tosefta: Translated from the Hebrew, with a New Introduction. Translated by Jacob Neusner, pages 615, 665, 841, 848, 877. Peabody, Massachusetts: Hendrickson Publishers, 2002.
Jerusalem Talmud: Berakhot 87a; Shabbat 106b; Pesachim 20b; Yoma 23b; Taanit 9b, 16b, 24b, 30a; Megillah 15b; Yevamot 43b; Nedarim 4a, 13a, 31b; Sotah 8a; Bava Kamma 24b. Tiberias, Land of Israel, circa 400 CE. In, e.g., Talmud Yerushalmi. Edited by Chaim Malinowitz, Yisroel Simcha Schorr, and Mordechai Marcus, volumes 2, 15, 18, 21, 25–26, 30, 33, 36, 41. Brooklyn: Mesorah Publications, 2006–2018. And in, e.g., The Jerusalem Talmud: A Translation and Commentary. Edited by Jacob Neusner and translated by Jacob Neusner, Tzvee Zahavy, B. Barry Levy, and Edward Goldman. Peabody, Massachusetts: Hendrickson Publishers, 2009.
Genesis Rabbah 1:5; 4:6; 12:2; 16:5; 22:12–13; 30:8; 31:9; 33:3; 36:3; 40:6; 42:3; 43:8; 53:4; 55:6; 56:2; 60:11; 63:8, 14; 64:8; 70:11; 71:6; 76:1–2; 95 (MSV); 97:6; 100:3, 11. Land of Israel, 5th century. In, e.g., Midrash Rabbah: Genesis. Translated by Harry Freedman and Maurice Simon, volume 1, pages 2, 32, 89, 130, 191–92, 236, 243, 263, 290, 331, 343, 358, 464, 486, 492; volume 2, pages 534, 565, 570, 578, 645, 657, 701–03, 919, 943, 990, 1001. London: Soncino Press, 1939.
Babylonian Talmud: Berakhot 7a, 55a, 62b; Shabbat 31a, 97a; Eruvin 53a; Pesachim 39a, 50a, 116b; Yoma 28b, 75a; Megillah 9a, 29a; Moed Katan 29a; Ketubot 111b–12a; 31b–32a, 64b–65a; Sotah 5a, 9b, 11a–13a, 35a, 36b; Kiddushin 13a; Bava Batra 120a; Sanhedrin 101b, 106a; Chullin 92a, 127a. Sasanian Empire, 6th century. In, e.g., Talmud Bavli. Edited by Yisroel Simcha Schorr, Chaim Malinowitz, and Mordechai Marcus, 72 volumes. Brooklyn: Mesorah Pubs., 2006.

Medieval
Exodus Rabbah 1:1–5:23. 10th century. In, e.g., Midrash Rabbah: Exodus. Translated by S. M. Lehrman. London: Soncino Press, 1939.
Rashi. Commentary. Exodus 1–6. Troyes, France, late 11th century. In, e.g., Rashi. The Torah: With Rashi's Commentary Translated, Annotated, and Elucidated. Translated and annotated by Yisrael Isser Zvi Herczeg, volume 2, pages 1–51. Brooklyn: Mesorah Publications, 1994.

Rashbam. Commentary on the Torah. Troyes, early 12th century. In, e.g., Rashbam's Commentary on Exodus: An Annotated Translation. Edited and translated by Martin I. Lockshin, pages 9–59. Atlanta: Scholars Press, 1997.
Judah Halevi. Kuzari. 4:3, 15. Toledo, Spain, 1130–1140. In, e.g., Jehuda Halevi. Kuzari: An Argument for the Faith of Israel. Introduction by Henry Slonimsky, pages 202, 221. New York: Schocken, 1964. 
Abraham ibn Ezra. Commentary on the Torah. France, 1153. In, e.g., Ibn Ezra's Commentary on the Pentateuch: Exodus (Shemot). Translated and annotated by H. Norman Strickman and Arthur M. Silver, volume 2, pages 1–128. New York: Menorah Publishing Company, 1996. 

Hezekiah ben Manoah. Hizkuni. France, circa 1240. In, e.g., Chizkiyahu ben Manoach. Chizkuni: Torah Commentary. Translated and annotated by Eliyahu Munk, volume 2, pages 348–81. Jerusalem: Ktav Publishers, 2013. 
Nachmanides. Commentary on the Torah. Jerusalem, circa 1270. In, e.g., Ramban (Nachmanides): Commentary on the Torah. Translated by Charles B. Chavel, volume 2, pages 3–62. New York: Shilo Publishing House, 1973. 

Zohar 2:2a–22a. Spain, late 13th century.
Midrash ha-Ne'lam (The Midrash of the Concealed). Spain, 13th century. In, e.g., Zohar, part 2, pages 4a–22a. Mantua, 1558–1560. In, e.g., The Zohar: Pritzker Edition. Translation and commentary by Nathan Wolski, volume 10, pages 448–524. Stanford, California: Stanford University Press, 2016. 
Jacob ben Asher (Baal Ha-Turim). Commentary on the Torah. Early 14th century. In, e.g., Baal Haturim Chumash: Shemos/Exodus. Translated by Eliyahu Touger, edited and annotated by Avie Gold, volume 2, pages 513–67. Brooklyn: Mesorah Publications, 2000. 
Bahya ben Asher. Commentary on the Torah. Spain, early 14th century. In, e.g., Midrash Rabbeinu Bachya: Torah Commentary by Rabbi Bachya ben Asher. Translated and annotated by Eliyahu Munk, volume 3, pages 739–815. Jerusalem: Lambda Publishers, 2003. 
Isaac ben Moses Arama. Akedat Yizhak (The Binding of Isaac). Late 15th century. In, e.g., Yitzchak Arama. Akeydat Yitzchak: Commentary of Rabbi Yitzchak Arama on the Torah. Translated and condensed by Eliyahu Munk, volume 1, pages 298–31. New York, Lambda Publishers, 2001.

Modern
Isaac Abravanel. Commentary on the Torah. Italy, between 1492–1509. In, e.g., Abarbanel: Selected Commentaries on the Torah: Volume 2: Shemos/Exodus. Translated and annotated by Israel Lazar, pages 23–84. Brooklyn: CreateSpace, 2015. 

Abraham Saba. Ẓeror ha-Mor (Bundle of Myrrh). Fez, Morocco, circa 1500. In, e.g., Tzror Hamor: Torah Commentary by Rabbi Avraham Sabba. Translated and annotated by Eliyahu Munk, volume 3, pages 844–94. Jerusalem, Lambda Publishers, 2008. 
Niccolò Machiavelli. The Prince, ch. 6. Florence, Italy, 1532.
Obadiah ben Jacob Sforno. Commentary on the Torah. Venice, 1567. In, e.g., Sforno: Commentary on the Torah. Translation and explanatory notes by Raphael Pelcovitz, pages 281–307. Brooklyn: Mesorah Publications, 1997. 

Moshe Alshich. Commentary on the Torah. Safed, circa 1593. In, e.g., Moshe Alshich. Midrash of Rabbi Moshe Alshich on the Torah. Translated and annotated by Eliyahu Munk, volume 2, pages 336–74. New York, Lambda Publishers, 2000. 
Shlomo Ephraim Luntschitz. Kli Yakar. Lublin, 1602. In, e.g., Kli Yakar: Shemos. Translated by Elihu Levine, volume 1, pages 23–79. Southfield, Michigan: Targum Press/Feldheim Publishers, 2002. 
Saul ha-Levi Morteira. "The People's Envy: Sermon on Shemot." Amsterdam, circa 1622. In Marc Saperstein. Jewish Preaching, 1200–1800: An Anthology, pages 270–85. New Haven: Yale University Press, 1989. 

Avraham Yehoshua Heschel. Commentaries on the Torah. Cracow, Poland, mid 17th century. Compiled as Chanukat HaTorah. Edited by Chanoch Henoch Erzohn. Piotrkow, Poland, 1900. In Avraham Yehoshua Heschel. Chanukas HaTorah: Mystical Insights of Rav Avraham Yehoshua Heschel on Chumash. Translated by Avraham Peretz Friedman, pages 117–24. Southfield, Michigan: Targum Press/Feldheim Publishers, 2004. 
Thomas Hobbes. Leviathan, 3:36, 37; 4:45. England, 1651. Reprint edited by C. B. Macpherson, pages 456, 460, 472, 671. Harmondsworth, England: Penguin Classics, 1982. 
Moshe Chaim Luzzatto Mesillat Yesharim, chapter 2. Amsterdam, 1740. In Mesillat Yesharim: The Path of the Just, page 31. Jerusalem: Feldheim, 1966. 

Chaim ibn Attar. Ohr ha-Chaim. Venice, 1742. In Chayim ben Attar. Or Hachayim: Commentary on the Torah. Translated by Eliyahu Munk, volume 2, pages 441–99. Brooklyn: Lambda Publishers, 1999. 
Moses Mendelssohn. Sefer Netivot Hashalom (The “Bi’ur,” The Explanation). Berlin, 1780–1783. In Moses Mendelssohn: Writings on Judaism, Christianity, and the Bible. Edited Michah Gottlieb, pages 216–19. Waltham, Massachusetts: Brandeis University Press, 2011. 
Nachman of Breslov. Teachings. Bratslav, Ukraine, before 1811. In Rebbe Nachman's Torah: Breslov Insights into the Weekly Torah Reading: Exodus-Leviticus. Compiled by Chaim Kramer, edited by Y. Hall, pages 21–55. Jerusalem: Breslov Research Institute, 2011. 

J.H. Ingraham. The Pillar of Fire: Or Israel in Bondage. New York: A. L. Burt, 1859. Reprinted Ann Arbor, Michigan: Scholarly Publishing Office, University of Michigan Library, 2006. 
Samson Raphael Hirsch. The Pentateuch: Exodus. Translated by Isaac Levy, volume 2, pages 3–63. Gateshead: Judaica Press, 2nd edition 1999. Originally published as Der Pentateuch uebersetzt und erklaert. Frankfurt, 1867–1878.

Samuel David Luzzatto (Shadal). Commentary on the Torah. Padua, 1871. In, e.g., Samuel David Luzzatto. Torah Commentary. Translated and annotated by Eliyahu Munk, volume 2, pages 505–60. New York: Lambda Publishers, 2012. 

Malbim. The Torah and the Commandments. Warsaw, 1874–80. In, e.g., Malbim: Rabbenu Meir Leibush ben Yechiel Michel. Commentary on the Torah. Translated by Zvi Faier, volume 4, pages 1–156. Israel: M.P. Press/Hillel Press, 1984.  (1982).
Yehudah Aryeh Leib Alter. Sefat Emet. Góra Kalwaria (Ger), Poland, before 1906. Excerpted in The Language of Truth: The Torah Commentary of Sefat Emet. Translated and interpreted by Arthur Green, pages 81–86. Philadelphia: Jewish Publication Society, 1998. Reprinted 2012. 

Hermann Cohen. Religion of Reason: Out of the Sources of Judaism. Translated with an introduction by Simon Kaplan; introductory essays by Leo Strauss, pages 42–43. New York: Ungar, 1972. Reprinted Atlanta: Scholars Press, 1995. Originally published as Religion der Vernunft aus den Quellen des Judentums. Leipzig: Gustav Fock, 1919.
Alexander Alan Steinbach. Sabbath Queen: Fifty-four Bible Talks to the Young Based on Each Portion of the Pentateuch, pages 39–42. New York: Behrman's Jewish Book House, 1936.
Arthur E. Southon. On Eagles' Wings. London: Cassell and Co., 1937. Reprinted New York: McGraw-Hill, 1954.
Sigmund Freud. Moses and Monotheism. 1939. Reprint, New York: Vintage, 1967. 
Zora Neale Hurston. Moses, Man of the Mountain. J.B. Lippincott, 1939. Reprint, Harper Perennial Modern Classics, 2008.
Benno Jacob. The Second Book of the Bible: Exodus. London, 1940. Translated by Walter Jacob, pages 3–141. Hoboken, New Jersey: KTAV Publishing House, 1992. 

Thomas Mann. Joseph and His Brothers. Translated by John E. Woods, pages 101, 492–93, 729, 788, 859. New York: Alfred A. Knopf, 2005. Originally published as Joseph und seine Brüder. Stockholm: Bermann-Fischer Verlag, 1943.
Thomas Mann. "Thou Shalt Have No Other Gods Before Me." In The Ten Commandments, pages 3–70. New York: Simon & Schuster, 1943.
Dorothy Clarke Wilson. Prince of Egypt. Philadelphia: Westminster Press, 1949.
Sholem Asch. Moses. New York: Putam, 1951.

Umberto Cassuto. A Commentary on the Book of Exodus. Jerusalem, 1951. Translated by Israel Abrahams, pages 5–75. Jerusalem: The Magnes Press, The Hebrew University, 1967.

Martin Buber. Moses: The Revelation and the Covenant. New York: Harper, 1958. Reprint, Humanity Books, 1988. 
Howard Fast. Moses, Prince of Egypt. New York: Crown Pubs., 1958.
Martin Noth. Exodus: A Commentary. Translated by John S. Bowden, pages 19–56. London: SCM Press, 1962. Translation of Das zweite Buch Mose, Exodus. Göttingen: Vandenhoeck & Ruprecht, 1959.
Dorothy M. Slusser. At the Foot of the Mountain: Stories from the Book of Exodus, pages 9–31. Philadelphia: Westminster Press, 1961.
Hans Kosmala. “The ‘Bloody Husband,’” Vetus Testamentum, volume 12 (1962): pages 14–28.
Bertil Albrektson. In Words and Meanings: Essays Presented to David Winton Thomas. Edited by Peter R. Ackroyd and Barnabas Lindars, pages 15–28. Cambridge: Cambridge University Press, 1968. 
Martin Buber. On the Bible: Eighteen studies, pages 44–62, 80–92. New York: Schocken Books, 1968.
Moshe Greenberg. Understanding Exodus, pages 18–130. New York: Behrman House, 1969.
Roland de Vaux. "The Revelation of the Divine Name YHVH." In Proclamation and Presence: Old Testament Essays in Honour of Gwynne Henton Davies. Edited by John I. Durham and J. Roy Porter, pages 48–75. London: SCM Press, 1970. 
Samuel Sandmel. Alone Atop the Mountain. Garden City, New York: Doubleday, 1973. 
A. M. Klein. "The Bitter Dish." In The Collected Poems of A. M. Klein, page 144. Toronto: McGraw-Hill Ryerson, 1974. 
James S. Ackerman. "The Literary Context of the Moses Birth Story (Exodus 1–2)." In Literary Interpretations of Biblical Narratives. Edited by Kenneth R.R. Gros Louis, with James and Thayer S. Warshaw, pages 74–119. Nashville: Abingdon Press, 1974. 

David Daiches. Moses: The Man and his Vision. New York: Praeger, 1975. 
Elie Wiesel. "Moses: Portrait of a Leader." In Messengers of God: Biblical Portraits & Legends, pages 174–210. New York: Random House, 1976. 
Michael Fishbane. “Exodus 1–4/The Prologue to the Exodus Cycle.” In Text and Texture: Close Readings of Selected Biblical Texts, pages 63–76. New York: Schocken Books, 1979. 
Robert R. Wilson, "The Hardening of Pharaoh's Heart." Catholic Biblical Quarterly, volume 41, number 1 (1979): pages 18–36.
Elie Munk. The Call of the Torah: An Anthology of Interpretation and Commentary on the Five Books of Moses. Translated by E.S. Mazer, volume 2, pages 2–73. Brooklyn: Mesorah Publications, 1995. Originally published as La Voix de la Thora. Paris: Fondation Samuel et Odette Levy, 1981.
Judith R. Baskin. Pharaoh's Counsellors: Job, Jethro, and Balaam in Rabbinic and Patristic Tradition. Brown Judaic Studies, 1983. 
Nahum M. Sarna. “Exploring Exodus: The Oppression.” The Biblical Archaeologist, volume 49, number 2 (June 1986): pages 68–80.
Pinchas H. Peli. Torah Today: A Renewed Encounter with Scripture, pages 55–58. Washington, D.C.: B'nai B'rith Books, 1987. 
Marc Gellman. Does God Have a Big Toe? Stories About Stories in the Bible, pages 65–71, 77–83. New York: HarperCollins, 1989. 
Mark S. Smith. The Early History of God: Yahweh and the Other Deities in Ancient Israel, pages 10, 92, 98, 166. New York: HarperSanFrancisco, 1990. 
Harvey J. Fields. A Torah Commentary for Our Times: Volume II: Exodus and Leviticus, pages 7–16. New York: UAHC Press, 1991. 
Nahum M. Sarna. The JPS Torah Commentary: Exodus: The Traditional Hebrew Text with the New JPS Translation, pages 3–30, 265–68. Philadelphia: Jewish Publication Society, 1991. 
Lawrence Kushner. God Was in This Place and I, I Did Not Know: Finding Self, Spirituality and Ultimate Meaning, pages 24–25. Jewish Lights Publishing, 1993. (the Burning Bush).
Nehama Leibowitz. New Studies in Shemot (Exodus), volume 1, pages 1–113. Jerusalem: Haomanim Press, 1993. Reprinted as New Studies in the Weekly Parasha. Lambda Publishers, 2010. 
Ilana Pardes. “Zipporah and the Struggle for Deliverance.” In Countertraditions in the Bible: A Feminist Approach, pages 79–97. Cambridge, Massachusetts: Harvard University Press, 1993..
Aaron Wildavsky. Assimilation versus Separation: Joseph the Administrator and the Politics of Religion in Biblical Israel, pages 1, 8, 13–15. New Brunswick, N.J.: Transaction Publishers, 1993. 
Walter Brueggemann. “The Book of Exodus.” In The New Interpreter's Bible. Edited by Leander E. Keck, volume 1, pages 675–731. Nashville: Abingdon Press, 1994. 
J. Cheryl Exum. “‘You Shall Let Every Daughter Live’: A Study of Exodus 1:8–2:10.” In A Feminist Companion to Exodus to Deuteronomy. Edited by Athalya Brenner, pages 37–61. Sheffield: JSOT Press, 1994. Reprinted Bloomsbury T&T Clark, 2000. 
Sandy Eisenberg Sasso. "In God's Name". Woodstock, Vermont: Jewish Lights Publishing, 1994. 

Judith S. Antonelli. "Yokheved and Miriam." In In the Image of God: A Feminist Commentary on the Torah, pages 137–45. Northvale, New Jersey: Jason Aronson, 1995. 
Barack Obama. Dreams from My Father, page 294. New York: Three Rivers Press, 1995, 2004. (Moses and Pharaoh).
Ellen Frankel. The Five Books of Miriam: A Woman’s Commentary on the Torah, pages 93–101. New York: G. P. Putnam's Sons, 1996. 
W. Gunther Plaut. The Haftarah Commentary, pages 122–30. New York: UAHC Press, 1996. 
Walter Wangerin, Jr. The Book of God: The Bible as a Novel, pages 101–11. Grand Rapids, Michigan: Zondervan, 1996. 
Jan Assmann. Moses the Egyptian: The Memory of Egypt in Western Monotheism. Harvard University Press, 1997.
Beginning the Journey: Toward a Women's Commentary on Torah. Edited by Emily H. Feigenson, pages 61–111, 153–55. Women of Reform Judaism, The Federation of Temple Sisterhoods, 1997.

Sorel Goldberg Loeb and Barbara Binder Kadden. Teaching Torah: A Treasury of Insights and Activities, pages 87–93. Denver: A.R.E. Publishing, 1997. 
Orson Scott Card. Stone Tables. Salt Lake City: Deseret Book Company, 1998. 
Jonathan Kirsch. Moses: A Life. New York: Ballantine, 1998. 
Jacob Milgrom. Leviticus 1–16, volume 3, page 747. New York: Anchor Bible, 1998. (bridegroom of blood).
William H.C. Propp. Exodus 1–18, volume 2, pages 119–261. New York: Anchor Bible, 1998. 
Elie Wiesel. "The Agony of Power, the Story of Moses." In Great Figures of the Bible, part 5. New York: Yale Roe Films, 1998.
Rachel Adelman. “Serah bat Asher: Songstress, Poet, and Woman of Wisdom.” In Torah of the Mothers: Contemporary Jewish Women Read Classical Jewish Texts. Edited by Ora Wiskind Elper and Susan Handelman, pages 218–43. New York and Jerusalem: Urim Publications, 2000.
Exodus to Deuteronomy: A Feminist Companion to the Bible (Second Series). Edited by Athalya Brenner, pages 14, 21–31, 33–34, 37, 39–40, 47–50, 52–53, 56, 59, 75–77, 83–87, 89, 92–96, 98–99, 101, 105, 107, 117, 159, 163–64, 196, 198. Sheffield: Sheffield Academic Press, 2000. 
Ora Wiskind Elper. “Exodus and the Feminine in the Teachings of Rabbi Yaakov of Izbica.” In Torah of the Mothers: Contemporary Jewish Women Read Classical Jewish Texts. Edited by Ora Wiskind Elper and Susan Handelman, pages 447–70. New York and Jerusalem: Urim Publications, 2000.
Bryna Jocheved Levy. “Moshe: Portrait of the Leader as a Young Man.” In Torah of the Mothers: Contemporary Jewish Women Read Classical Jewish Texts. Edited by Ora Wiskind Elper and Susan Handelman, pages 398–429. New York and Jerusalem: Urim Publications, 2000.
Brenda Ray. The Midwife's Song: A Story of Moses' Birth. Port St. Joe, Florida: Karmichael Press, 2000. 

Robert Bly. "Moses' Cradle." In The Night Abraham Called to the Stars: Poems, page 9. New York: HarperCollins/Perennial, 2001. 
Avivah Gottlieb Zornberg. The Particulars of Rapture: Reflections on Exodus, pages 17–80. New York: Doubleday, 2001. 
Lainie Blum Cogan and Judy Weiss. Teaching Haftarah: Background, Insights, and Strategies, pages 244–52, 364–73. Denver: A.R.E. Publishing, 2002. 
Michael Fishbane. The JPS Bible Commentary: Haftarot, pages 80–87, 255–62. Philadelphia: Jewish Publication Society, 2002. 
Joel Cohen. Moses: A Memoir. Mahwah, New Jersey: Paulist Press, 2003. 
Ogden Goelet. "Moses' Egyptian Name." Bible Review, volume 19, number 3 (June 2003): pages 12–17, 50–51.
Reuven Hammer. Or Hadash: A Commentary on Siddur Sim Shalom for Shabbat and Festivals, page 30. New York: The Rabbinical Assembly, 2003. (The Name of God).
Scott N. Morschauser. “Potters' Wheels and Pregnancies: A Note on Exodus 1:16.” Journal of Biblical Literature, volume 122, number 4 (Winter 2003): pages 731–33.
Joseph Telushkin. The Ten Commandments of Character: Essential Advice for Living an Honorable, Ethical, Honest Life, pages 150–52, 290–91. New York: Bell Tower, 2003. 
Robert Alter. The Five Books of Moses: A Translation with Commentary, pages 307–38. New York: W.W. Norton & Co., 2004. 
Jeffrey H. Tigay. "Exodus." In The Jewish Study Bible. Edited by Adele Berlin and Marc Zvi Brettler, pages 107–15. New York: Oxford University Press, 2004. 
Marek Halter. Zipporah, Wife of Moses, 1–245. New York: Crown, 2005. 
Professors on the Parashah: Studies on the Weekly Torah Reading Edited by Leib Moscovitz, pages 89–93. Jerusalem: Urim Publications, 2005.
Rebecca Kohn. Seven Days to the Sea: An Epic Novel of the Exodus. New York: Rugged Land, 2006. 
Lawrence Kushner. Kabbalah: A Love Story, pages 78, 112. New York: Morgan Road Books, 2006. 
Kevin McGeough. “Birth Bricks, Potter's Wheels, and Exodus 1,16.” Biblica, volume 87, number 3 (2006): pages 305–18.
W. Gunther Plaut. The Torah: A Modern Commentary: Revised Edition. Revised edition edited by David E.S. Stern, pages 343–78. New York: Union for Reform Judaism, 2006. 
Suzanne A. Brody. "Torah Sparks" and "Holy Ground." In Dancing in the White Spaces: The Yearly Torah Cycle and More Poems, pages 11, 75. Shelbyville, Kentucky: Wasteland Press, 2007. 

James L. Kugel. How To Read the Bible: A Guide to Scripture, Then and Now, pages 60, 65, 159, 198–216, 365, 425, 440, 533, 550, 562, 571, 578. New York: Free Press, 2007. 
Joseph Blenkinsopp. “The Midianite-Kenite Hypothesis Revisited and the Origins of Judah.” Journal for the Study of the Old Testament, volume 33, number 2 (December 2008): pages 131–53.
Shmuel Goldin. Unlocking the Torah Text: An In-Depth Journey into the Weekly Parsha: Shmot, pages 1–35. Jerusalem: Gefen Publishing House, 2008.
The Torah: A Women's Commentary. Edited by Tamara Cohn Eskenazi and Andrea L. Weiss, pages 305–30. New York: URJ Press, 2008. 
Thomas B. Dozeman. Commentary on Exodus, pages 55–159. Grand Rapids, Michigan: William B. Eerdmans Publishing Company, 2009. 
Reuven Hammer. Entering Torah: Prefaces to the Weekly Torah Portion, pages 77–82. New York: Gefen Publishing House, 2009. 
Edward M. Kennedy. True Compass, pages 190–91. New York: Twelve, 2009. (Senator Willis Robertson's interpretation of Pharaoh's daughter's finding of Moses).
Elliot Kukla. “Making Noise for Social Change: Parashat Shemot (Exodus 1:1–6:1).” In Torah Queeries: Weekly Commentaries on the Hebrew Bible. Edited by Gregg Drinkwater, Joshua Lesser, and David Shneer; foreword by Judith Plaskow, pages 75–79. New York: New York University Press, 2009. 
Alicia Jo Rabins. "Snow/Scorpions and Spiders." In Girls in Trouble. New York: JDub Music, 2009. (Miriam watching over the infant Moses).
Bruce Wells. "Exodus." In Zondervan Illustrated Bible Backgrounds Commentary. Edited by John H. Walton, volume 1, pages 165–82. Grand Rapids, Michigan: Zondervan, 2009. 
Nick Wyatt. “Circumcision and Circumstance: Male Genital Mutilation in Ancient Israel and Ugarit.” Journal for the Study of the Old Testament, volume 33, number 4 (June 2009): pages 405–31..
Rebecca G.S. Idestrom. “Echoes of the Book of Exodus in Ezekiel.” Journal for the Study of the Old Testament, volume 33, number 4 (June 2009): pages 489–510. (Motifs from Exodus found in Ezekiel, including the call narrative, divine encounters, captivity, signs, plagues, judgment, redemption, tabernacle/temple, are considered.).
Jonathan P. Burnside. “Exodus and Asylum: Uncovering the Relationship between Biblical Law and Narrative.” Journal for the Study of the Old Testament, volume 34, number 3 (March 2010): pages 243–66..
Idan Dershowitz. “A Land Flowing with Fat and Honey.” Vetus Testamentum, volume 60, number 2 (2010): pages 172–76.
Brad Embry. “The Endangerment of Moses: Towards a New Reading of Exodus 4:24–26.” Vetus Testamentum, volume 60, number 2 (2010): pages 177–96.
Jean-Pierre Sonnet. “Ehyeh asher ehyeh (Exodus 3:14): God’s ‘Narrative Identity’ among Suspense, Curiosity, and Surprise.” Poetics Today, volume 31, number 2 (Summer 2010): pages 331–51.
Julie Cadwallader-Staub. Joy. In Face to Face: A Poetry Collection. DreamSeeker Books, 2010. ("land of milk and honey").
Adam J. Howell. “The Firstborn Son of Moses as the ‘Relative of Blood’ in Exodus 4.24–26.” Journal for the Study of the Old Testament, volume 35, number 1 (September 2010): pages 63–76.
Stuart Lasine. “Everything Belongs to Me: Holiness, Danger, and Divine Kingship in the Post-Genesis World.” Journal for the Study of the Old Testament, volume 35, number 1 (September 2010): pages 31–62..

Adriane Leveen. “Inside Out: Jethro, the Midianites and a Biblical Construction of the Outsider.” Journal for the Study of the Old Testament, volume 34, number 4 (June 2010): pages 395–417.
Jonathan Sacks. Covenant & Conversation: A Weekly Reading of the Jewish Bible: Exodus: The Book of Redemption, pages 19–40. Jerusalem: Maggid Books, 2010. 

Shmuel Herzfeld. "No Excuses for a Recalcitrant Husband." In Fifty-Four Pick Up: Fifteen-Minute Inspirational Torah Lessons, pages 73–79. Jerusalem: Gefen Publishing House, 2012. 
John Makujina. “Literary Solutions to Legal Problems: The Contribution of Exodus 2.13–14 to Exodus 21.22–23.” Journal for the Study of the Old Testament, volume 37, number 2 (December 2012): pages 151–65.
Torah MiEtzion: New Readings in Tanach: Shemot. Edited by Ezra Bick and Yaakov Beasley, pages 1–59. Jerusalem: Maggid Books, 2012. 
Walter Brueggemann. “Truth Speaks to Power: Moses.” In Truth Speaks to Power: The Countercultural Nature of Scripture, pages 11–42. Louisville, Kentucky: Westminster John Knox Press, 2013. (Pharaoh is a metaphor embodying raw, absolute, worldly power).
Kenneth Ngwa. “Ethnicity, Adoption, and Exodus: A Socio-Rhetorical Reading of Exodus 2.1–10.” Journal for the Study of the Old Testament, volume 38, number 2 (December 2013): pages 163–87.
Mathilde Frey. “Sabbath in Egypt? An Examination of Exodus 5.” Journal for the Study of the Old Testament, volume 39, number 3 (March 2015): pages 249–63.
David Pettit. “When the Lord Seeks to Kill Moses: Reading Exodus 4.24–26 in its Literary Context.” Journal for the Study of the Old Testament, volume 40, number 2 (December 2015): pages 163–77.
Jonathan Sacks. Lessons in Leadership: A Weekly Reading of the Jewish Bible, pages 61–65. New Milford, Connecticut: Maggid Books, 2015. 
David Fohrman. The Exodus You Almost Passed Over. Aleph Beta Press, 2016. 
“The Hittites: Between Tradition and History.” Biblical Archaeology Review, volume 42, number 2 (March/April 2016): pages 28–40, 68.
Jean-Pierre Isbouts. Archaeology of the Bible: The Greatest Discoveries From Genesis to the Roman Era, pages 80–103. Washington, D.C.: National Geographic, 2016. 
Jonathan Sacks. Essays on Ethics: A Weekly Reading of the Jewish Bible, pages 79–83. New Milford, Connecticut: Maggid Books, 2016. 
Kenneth Seeskin. Thinking about the Torah: A Philosopher Reads the Bible, pages 71–84. Philadelphia: The Jewish Publication Society, 2016.
Shai Held. The Heart of Torah, Volume 1: Essays on the Weekly Torah Portion: Genesis and Exodus, pages 123–33. Philadelphia: Jewish Publication Society, 2017. 
James L. Kugel. The Great Shift: Encountering God in Biblical Times, pages 6, 15, 29, 139, 164, 349, 384. Boston: Houghton Mifflin Harcourt, 2017. 

Steven Levy and Sarah Levy. The JPS Rashi Discussion Torah Commentary, pages 41–43. Philadelphia: Jewish Publication Society, 2017.
Tina Dykesteen Nilsen. “Memories of Moses: A Survey Through Genres.” Journal for the Study of the Old Testament, volume 41, number 3 (March 2017): pages 287–312.
Pekka Pitkänen. “Ancient Israelite Population Economy: Ger, Toshav, Nakhri and Karat as Settler Colonial Categories.” Journal for the Study of the Old Testament, volume 42, number 2 (December 2017): pages 139–53.
Leon R. Kass. Founding God's Nation: Reading Exodus, pages 21–107. New Haven: Yale University Press, 2021.

External links

Texts
Masoretic text and 1917 JPS translation
Hear the parashah chanted
Hear the parashah read in Hebrew

Commentaries

Academy for Jewish Religion, California
Academy for Jewish Religion, New York
Aish.com
Akhlah: The Jewish Children's Learning Network
Aleph Beta Academy
American Jewish University—Ziegler School of Rabbinic Studies
Anshe Emes Synagogue, Los Angeles
Ari Goldwag
Ascent of Safed
Bar-Ilan University
Chabad.org
eparsha.com
G-dcast
The Israel Koschitzky Virtual Beit Midrash
Jewish Agency for Israel
Jewish Theological Seminary
Kabbala Online
Mechon Hadar
Miriam Aflalo 
MyJewishLearning.com
Ohr Sameach
Orthodox Union
OzTorah, Torah from Australia
Oz Ve Shalom—Netivot Shalom
Pardes from Jerusalem
Professor James L. Kugel
Professor Michael Carasik
Rabbi Dov Linzer
Rabbi Eliezer Melamed
Rabbi Fabian Werbin
Rabbi Jonathan Sacks
RabbiShimon.com
Rabbi Shlomo Riskin
Rabbi Shmuel Herzfeld
Rabbi Stan Levin
Reconstructionist Judaism 
Sephardic Institute 
Shiur.com
613.org Jewish Torah Audio
Tanach Study Center
Teach613.org, Torah Education at Cherry Hill
TheTorah.com
Torah from Dixie
Torah.org
TorahVort.com
Union for Reform Judaism
United Synagogue of Conservative Judaism
What's Bothering Rashi?
Yeshivat Chovevei Torah
Yeshiva University

Weekly Torah readings in Tevet
Weekly Torah readings from Exodus